Mehran Sheikhi is an Iranian wrestler who participated at the 2010 Summer Youth Olympics in Singapore. He won the silver medal in the boys' freestyle 46 kg event, losing to Aldar Balzhinimaev of Russia in the final.

References 

Wrestlers at the 2010 Summer Youth Olympics
Living people
Iranian male sport wrestlers
Year of birth missing (living people)